Hytale is an upcoming sandbox game by Hypixel Studios. Production began in 2015 by developers from the Minecraft multiplayer server Hypixel with funding from Riot Games, who later bought the studio in 2020. The developers are aiming to release the game on PC, consoles and mobile devices.

Gameplay 
Hytale features a procedurally-generated fantasy world composed of blocks of numerous shapes arranged in a three-dimensional grid, featuring different biomes, creatures, and dungeons. Players can participate in minigames similar to those found on the Hypixel server. Players will be able to build and share mods and custom content using a set of browser-based and in-game tools.

Hytale includes several procedurally-generated areas of the world known as "zones", made up of many biomes and mobs. This mode will feature RPG-styled combat and include dynamic boss encounters and dungeon exploration. Hytale will feature block-based construction and includes many different world editing and cinematic tools players can use in-game. It will feature a scripting system that allows players to create and execute code in-game, as well as a web-based 3D modeling, texturing, and animation toolkit based on CraftStudio which players can use to create custom assets for the game. The game will feature both official and community-run servers with the ability to implement custom features and minigames including player versus player (PvP) games.

Development 
Hytale is being developed by Hypixel Studios for PC, consoles, and mobile devices. Originally the client was being developed in C# with the server technology in Java, but in 2022 they announced that they'd started rewriting the engine (both client and server) in C++ to enable them to more easily release the game across-platforms and also for the performance benefits. Directed by Aaron Donaghey, the Northern Ireland-based studio consists of over forty employees who split off from Hypixel Inc., the company behind the development of the Hypixel server in Minecraft. Development of Hytale started in early 2015. The idea for Hytale arose due to EULA changes by Mojang in 2014 which blocked servers from having microtransactions that affected gameplay, leading to an 85% drop in the Hypixel server's revenue. The developers realized they were not in control of their project and decided to make their own stand-alone game. They originally wanted to avoid making a voxel-based game, but eventually decided to do so as they had experience in that genre from the Hypixel server in Minecraft.

Hypixel Studios was at first self-financed with revenue generated by the Hypixel server. The studio subsequently received support from Riot Games, which invested several million dollars in the studio, along with an advisory group that includes businessmen Dennis Fong, Rob Pardo, and Peter Levine. The studio was fully acquired by Riot Games in April 2020. Hytale was announced via a trailer in December 2018, with it amassing over 31 million views within a month. The game, originally intended to be playable in 2021, was delayed due to an increase of the game's scope, including an engine rewrite in C++.

Reception 
Hytale was nominated in the Most Wanted Game category at the 2019 Golden Joystick Awards but lost to Cyberpunk 2077. The game was also named the most anticipated at the 2021 Northern Ireland Game Awards.

References

External links 

Adventure games
Fantasy video games
macOS games
Multiplayer and single-player video games
Open-world video games
Upcoming video games
Video games developed in the United Kingdom
Indie video games
Video games using procedural generation
Windows games